Sola Allyson-Obaniyi, popularly known as Shola Allyson or Sola Allyson(born on 24 September 1971), is a Nigerian soul, folk, and gospel singer and songwriter. She came into limelight with the hit album Eji Owuro (2003), which was the soundtrack album for a film of the same title. After Eji Owuro, she released other albums like Gbeje F'ori, Ire and Im'oore amongst others. Her popular songs include: "Eji Owuro", "Obinrin Ni Mi", "Aseye", "Isinmi", amongst others. Apart from being a singer, she is also a voice coach, counsellor and a consultant. She also makes music covers for Nigerian movies.

Early life and education
Sola Allyson Obaniyi was born in Ikorodu, Lagos State in the early 1970s. She had her primary education at Anglican Primary School, Ikorodu, after which she attended Shams-el-deen Grammar School, Ikorodu for her secondary education. She subsequently attended Government Technical College, Agidingbi, Ikeja, where she studied Business Studies and obtained an NBTE Certificate.

In 1997, she gained admission into The Polytechnic, Ibadan to study Music Technology, majoring in Voice and minoring in Music.  She met with a prof.called Oluwole  Oladejo Adetiran who mentored her music career, she later acquired a Higher National Diploma (HND) degree with an Upper Credit.

She was born into a muslim family and she went to various churches and one of them is CCC olushesi parish (apata igbala) iju ishaga

Career
Sola Allyson Obaniyi started her career as a back-up singer in the late 1980s, when she was only thirteen. She later became a professional back-up singer and worked with musicians such as: Yinka Ayefele, Gbenga Adeboye, Pasuma, Obesere, and Daddy Showkey. The opportunity to make her first album Eji Owuro, came when she met a man with a movie script in a public bus. The man initiated a conversation with Allyson, telling her about a film shoot he just concluded, titled "Orekelewa". Allyson was eventually called to sing a soundtrack for the film, which led to the change in the title of the film to "Eji Owuro". When Eji Owuro the film, was released, the studio decided to make a full music album for the film. The album, upon release, became a huge success commercially and critically, launching Allyson into the music industry.

Personal life
Allyson got married in March 2003. She met her husband, Toyin Obaniyi in the church choir. Together, they have 3 children: Ayobami, Mopelola and Obafunmiwo.

Discography

Albums
Eji Owuro (2003)
Gbe Je F'ori (2005)
Ire (2007)
Im'oore (2009)
Adun (2012)
Ope (2015)
Imuse (2018)
Iri  (2019)
Isodotun (2021)
IMISI(2022)

References

6. Mr Fountain (2021). Gospel Fountain

External links

Nigerian gospel singers
Nigerian soul singers
Nigerian folklorists
Living people
Nigerian women singer-songwriters
Nigerian women musicians
Yoruba women musicians
Yoruba-language singers
21st-century Nigerian women  singers
The Polytechnic, Ibadan alumni
1970s births
Musicians from Lagos State
Women folklorists